Nogler is a surname. Notable people with the surname include:

Ermanno Nogler (1921–2000), Italian alpine skier
Hans Nogler (1919–2011), Italian alpine skier, brother of Sophie
Lotte Nogler (born 1947), Italian alpine skier
Sophie Nogler (1924–2015), Austrian alpine skier, sister of Hans